Haikhani is the name of a small Punjabi Muslim tribe originating principally in West Punjab, originally concentrated in some parts of Lahore.

In accordance to their traditions, the Haikhani are descended from Ghaznavid Pashtuns.

Punjabi tribes
Social groups of Pakistan